Trochomodulus calusa is a species of sea snail, a marine gastropod mollusk in the family Modulidae.

Subspecies
 Trochomodulus calusa calusa (Petuch, 1988)
 Trochomodulus calusa foxhalli (Petuch & R. F. Myers, 2014)

Distribution

Description 
The maximum recorded shell length is 15 mm.

Habitat 
Minimum recorded depth is 1.5 m. Maximum recorded depth is 1.5 m.

References

 Petuch E.J. (1988). Neogene history of tropical American mollusks. Charlottesville, Virginia: The Coastal Education and Research Foundation. 217 pp., 23 figs + unnumbered figs, 39 pls.
 Landau B., Vermeij G. K. & Reich S. (2014). Classification of the Modulidae (Caenogastropoda, Cerithioidea), with new genera and new fossil species from the Neogene of tropical America and Indonesia. Basteria. 78(1-3): 1-29.

External links

Modulidae
Gastropods described in 1988